Sabhash Suri is an Indian 1964 Indian Telugu-language romantic comedy film, produced by T. R. Chakravarthy under the R. R. Pictures banner and directed by I. N. Murthy. It stars N. T. Rama Rao, Krishna Kumari with the music composed by Pendyala Nageswara Rao. The film is a remake of the Tamil film Periya Idathu Penn (1963).

Plot 
Suryam (N. T. Rama Rao), an ordinary farmer lives along with his widowed sister Nagamma (Sandhya). Suryam always gives a tough fight with the landlord of the village Kailasam (Ramana Reddy). Kailasam has a son Seshu (Rajanala) and a daughter Jalaja (Krishna Kumari) who are egoistic and stubborn as growing up in a rich family. Mastanaiah (Jagga Rao) is the maternal uncle of Suryam who has two daughters Ganga (Vasantha) and Gauri (Geetanjali). Suryam and Ganga like each other and the elders want them to get married, but Seshu wants to marry Ganga. Mastaniah, in a dilemma, wants to test Seshu and Suryam's talent in martial arts. Jalaja plays a foul plan to defeat Suryam with her classmate Vaali (Padmanabham) by double-crossing that she will marry him. Ultimately, Suryam is defeated and Seshu marries Ganga. Valli is also affected by Jalaja. So he reveals the truth to Suryam, knowing this, Suryam challenges Jalaja he will teach her a lesson by marrying her. Suryam's sister Nagamma is molested by Kailasam and she commits suicide. A devastated Suryam heads to the city, where he meets Vaali and together they conceive a plan that will avenge them against their oppressors. Vaali makes Suryam educated and showcases him as a rich man Suraj before Jalaja and is successful in making her feel his love. Suryam reaches the village in disguise and marries Jalaja. The rest of the story is about how he teaches a lesson to Kailasam and his family.

Cast 
N. T. Rama Rao as Suryam
Krishna Kumari as Jalaja
Rajanala as Seshu
Ramana Reddy as Kailasam
Padmanabham as Vaali
Jagga Rao as Mastanaiah
Geetanjali as Gowri
Sandhya as Nagamma
Vasanthi as Ganga

Soundtrack 
Music composed by Pendyala Nageswara Rao. Lyrics were written by Acharya Aatreya.

References

External links 
 

1964 romantic comedy films
1960s Telugu-language films
Films scored by Pendyala Nageswara Rao
Indian romantic comedy films
Telugu remakes of Tamil films